Facundo Sebastián Roncaglia (born 10 February 1987) is an Argentine professional footballer who plays for Boca Juniors. Mainly a central defender, he can also play as a right-back.

Club career
Born in Chajarí, Entre Ríos Province of Italian descent, Roncaglia made his professional debut with Boca Juniors, his first Primera División match being on 21 October 2007 in a 1–1 draw against Estudiantes de La Plata. He helped the capital team win the 2008 Apertura.

On 27 July 2009, Roncaglia signed with La Liga side RCD Espanyol on loan, being part of a squad that also featured five compatriots – including manager Mauricio Pochettino and former Boca teammate Juan Forlín. He returned to his previous team at the end of the season, only to make an immediate move to Estudiantes on loan.

Roncaglia left Boca in July 2012 as a free agent, having scored in the first leg of the 2012 Copa Libertadores final against Sport Club Corinthians Paulista late in the previous month (1–1 home draw, 3–1 aggregate loss). He joined ACF Fiorentina in Italy immediately after, going on to appear in an average of 22 Serie A matches during his spell and also being loaned to fellow league club Genoa CFC.

On 12 July 2016, Roncaglia returned to Spanish football after agreeing to a four-year deal with RC Celta de Vigo. On 11 May 2017, he headed home in a 1–1 away draw against Manchester United in the second leg of the semi-finals of the UEFA Europa League, but was also sent off following a spat with Eric Bailly and his team was also ousted 2–1 on aggregate.

On 31 January 2019, Roncaglia was loaned to Valencia CF until June. On 8 August, after returning from loan, he signed a one-year contract with fellow top-tier club CA Osasuna for a fee of € 250,000.

International career
Roncaglia made his debut for Argentina on 15 November 2013, playing 63 minutes in a 0–0 friendly draw in Ecuador. He was selected by coach Gerardo Martino for the 2015 Copa América and started in the team's opening fixture, a 2–2 draw against Paraguay in La Serena.

Career statistics

Club

Honours
Boca Juniors
Argentine Primera División: 2008 Apertura, 2011 Apertura, 2022
Copa Argentina: 2011–12
Supercopa Argentina: 2022
Recopa Sudamericana: 2008

Estudiantes
Argentine Primera División: 2010 Apertura

Valencia
Copa del Rey: 2018–19

Fiorentina
Coppa Italia runner-up: 2013–14

Argentina
Copa América runner-up: 2015, 2016

References

External links

1987 births
Living people
People from Federación Department
Argentine people of Italian descent
Sportspeople from Entre Ríos Province
Argentine footballers
Association football defenders
Argentine Primera División players
Boca Juniors footballers
Estudiantes de La Plata footballers
La Liga players
RCD Espanyol footballers
RC Celta de Vigo players
Valencia CF players
CA Osasuna players
Serie A players
ACF Fiorentina players
Genoa C.F.C. players
Cypriot First Division players
Aris Limassol FC players
Argentina international footballers
2015 Copa América players
Copa América Centenario players
Argentine expatriate footballers
Expatriate footballers in Spain
Expatriate footballers in Italy
Expatriate footballers in Cyprus
Argentine expatriate sportspeople in Spain
Argentine expatriate sportspeople in Italy
Argentine expatriate sportspeople in Cyprus